Bismark Ngissah (born 9 January 1998) is a Ghanaian football player. He plays in Albania for Skënderbeu Korçë.

Club career
He made his professional debut in the Lega Pro for Arezzo on 13 March 2016 in a game against Ancona.

On 2 September 2019, he joined Imolese on a season-long loan. On 31 January 2020, he moved on a new loan to Vis Pesaro.

On 2 October 2020 he returned to Vis Pesaro on a one-year contract.

On 15 January 2021, he moved to Pro Sesto.

On 23 July 2021, he moved to Skënderbeu Korçë in the Albanian SuperLiga (Superleague).

References

External links
 

1998 births
Living people
Ghanaian footballers
Association football forwards
S.S. Arezzo players
U.S. Viterbese 1908 players
Imolese Calcio 1919 players
Vis Pesaro dal 1898 players
S.S.D. Pro Sesto players
KF Skënderbeu Korçë players
Serie C players
Kategoria Superiore players
Ghanaian expatriate footballers
Expatriate footballers in Italy
Ghanaian expatriate sportspeople in Italy
Expatriate footballers in Albania
Ghanaian expatriate sportspeople in Albania